The 1993 Montana State Bobcats football team was an American football team that represented Montana State University in the Big Sky Conference during the 1993 NCAA Division I-AA football season. In their second season under head coach Cliff Hysell, the Bobcats compiled a 7–4 record (4–3 against Big Sky opponents) and finished fourth in the Big Sky.

Schedule

References

Montana State
Montana State Bobcats football seasons
Montana State Bobcats football